The Shri Krishna mandir or the Krishna Temple  is a Hindu Temple located between the Rawalpindi Railway Station and Kabari Bazaar in Saddar, in the Rawalpindi in the Punjab province of Pakistan. Currently it is the most popular place of worship for the Hindus living in the Rawalpindi and Islamabad Hindu festivals like Holi, Diwali etc are celebrated here.

History

The temple was built by Kanji Mal and Ujagar Mal Ram Rachpal in 1897 as a place of worship for the Hindus living in the surrounding areas. During the partition, the Krishna Temple was closed in 1947. After the partition, the Krishna temple was opened in 1949 and was handed over to the local Hindu Punchayat for those Hindus who chose to remain in Pakistan and it became the main place of worship for Rawalpindi Hindus.

In 1970, the temple was taken over by the Evacuee Trust Property Board, which leased the area surrounding it to local traders. The Hindu community has been protesting against this occupation of the temple land.

Renovation
In 2018, the Punjab government released Rs20 million for the renovation of the temple. And the renovation and restoration was completed in 2020.

See also
 Ramapir Temple Tando Allahyar
 Hinglaj Mata mandir
 Kalka Cave Temple
 Umarkot Shiv Mandir
 Krishna Temple, Sadiqabad
 Baba Ram Thaman Shrine

References

Hindu temples in Pakistan
Krishna temples
Hindu temples in Punjab, Pakistan